The black-breasted gnateater (Conopophaga snethlageae) is a species of bird in the family Conopophagidae. It is found in Amazonian Brazil.

Taxonomy
Two subspecies are recognised:

C. s. snethlageae von Berlepsch, 1912 - central Brazil. 
C. s. pallida Snethlage, E, 1914 - southeast Amazonian Brazil

Status

The IUCN has assessed the ash-throated gnateater as being of Least Concern.

References

Conopophaga
Birds of the Amazon Basin
Birds described in 1856